Victoria College is or was the name of several institutions of secondary or higher education, and may refer to:

Asia

 Victoria International College, Kuala Lumpur, Malaysia
 Government Victoria College, Palakkad, India
 Victoria College, Chulipuram, Sri Lanka 
 Victoria College, Comilla, Bangladesh
 Victoria College, Narail, Bangladesh
 Victoria College, Hong Kong, former name of Queen's College
 Victoria Institution, former English school in Kuala Lumpur, Malaysia, now a national school.
 Victoria School, Singapore
 Victoria Technical School, Hong Kong, former name of Tang Siu Kin Victoria Government Secondary School
 Victoria International College, Dang, Nepal

Africa
 Victoria College, Alexandria, Egypt
 Victoria College, Stellenbosch, South Africa, former name of Stellenbosch University

Australia/New Zealand
 Victoria College, Melbourne, now-defunct college in Australia
 Victoria College, Wellington, New Zealand, later Victoria University College, now Victoria University of Wellington
 Victorian College of the Arts, University of Melbourne, Australia

Europe
 Victoria College, Belfast, a grammar school in Northern Ireland
 Victoria College, Jersey, Channel Islands
 Victoria College of Music and Drama, UK
 Victoria Park College, Manchester, UK

North America
 Victoria University, Toronto (Victoria College) at the University of Toronto
 Victoria College, British Columbia, Canada, later became the University of Victoria
 Victoria College of Art, Victoria, British Columbia, Canada
 Victoria College (Texas), a community college located in Victoria, Texas, USA
 Royal Victoria College, an all-female residence of McGill University, in Montreal, Quebec, Canada

See also 
 Victoria University (disambiguation)